The 1992–93 Vyshcha Liha season was the second since its establishment.
Tavriya Simferopol were the defending champions, having won their 1st national league title in history. A total of sixteen teams participated in the competition, fourteen of them contested the 1992 season while the remaining two were promoted from the Ukrainian First League.

The competition began on August 15, 1992, with four games finishing on June 20, 1993. The competition was suspended for the winter break on November 22, 1992, and resumed on March 14, 1993.

On June 20, 1993 Dynamo Kyiv earned their first Ukrainian title with a 4–1 away victory over Kremin Kremenchuk. The Kyivan club was declared a champion by the goal difference as both Dynamo and Dnipro finished equal on points. The teams met just three rounds before the end in Dnipropetrovsk where Dnipro was victorious by a minimum margin thanks to the goal of Yuriy Maksymov.

Anatoliy Puzach was replaced as the coach of Dynamo Kyiv following its disastrous rendezvous with Belgian Anderlecht yielding it 2-7 on an aggregate and losing at home 0-3.

Teams

Promotions 
 Veres Rivne, the champion of the 1992 Ukrainian First League (Group A) – (debut)
 Kryvbas Kryvyi Rih, the champion of the 1992 Ukrainian First League (Group B) – (debut)

Kryvbas is a multi-times champion of the Championship of the Ukrainian SSR.

No relegation at the end of the season as the league was scheduled to be expanded to 18 participants.

Stadiums 

Notes:

Managers

Managerial changes

Qualification to European competitions for 1993–94 
 Following the agreement between UEFA, Russia and Ukraine, Russia inherited the 1992 European ranking of Soviet Union, while Ukraine was awarded a slot of defunct East Germany for the 1993–94 UEFA Cup. The Ukrainian Cup winner qualifies for the 1993–94 European Cup Winners' Cup qualifying round.

Qualified Teams 
 During the 27th Round, Dynamo Kyiv qualified for European football for the 1993–94 season.
 After the 29th Round, Dnipro Dnipropetrovsk qualified for European football for the 1993–94 season.
 After the 30th Round, Karpaty Lviv qualified for the 1993–94 European Cup Winners' Cup, Dynamo qualified for the 1993–94 UEFA Champions League, Dnipro qualified for the 1993–94 UEFA Cup.

League table 

 Dynamo Kyiv won its first championship title by earning the 18th win of the season in the Round 30 away against Kremin Kremenchuk at Dnipro Stadium, Kremenchuk on June 20, 1993.

Results

Top goalscorers

Clean sheets

Medal squads 
(league appearances and goals listed in brackets)

Note: Players in italic are whose playing position is uncertain.

See also 
 Continental competitions: 1992-93 European Cup, 1992-93 European Cup Winners' Cup, 1992-93 UEFA Cup
 Domestic leagues: 1992-93 Ukrainian First League, 1992-93 Ukrainian Second League, 1992-93 Ukrainian Transitional League, 1992-93 Ukrainian Football Amateur League
 Domestic cups: 1992-93 Ukrainian Cup

References

External links 
Season information on the Ukrainian Football from Dmytro Troshchiy
Season information on RSSSF
Season information on the Ukrainian Football from Aleksei Kobyzev

Ukrainian Premier League seasons
1992–93 in Ukrainian association football leagues
Ukra